The Cunningham Medal is the premier award of the Royal Irish Academy. It is awarded every three years in recognition of "outstanding contributions to scholarship and the objectives of the Academy".

History
It was which was established in 1796 at the bequest of barrister Timothy Cunningham of Gray's Inn. After a period of uncertainty and experimentation regarding the terms and conditions of the award, it was agreed in 1848 that the medals would be open to the authors of works or essays in the areas of Science, Polite Literature and Antiquities, published in Ireland or about Irish subjects. After 1885, the academy stopped giving the award, but it was revived in 1989 for the bicentennial of Cunningham's gift.

Recipients

The following persons have been awarded the Cunningham Medal:

1796: Thomas Wallace
1800: Theophilus Swift (writing, poetry)
1805: William Preston (poetry)
1818: John Brinkley (astronomy)
1827: John D'Alton (history)
1830: George Petrie (history)
1833: George Petrie (history)
1834: William Rowan Hamilton (mathematics)
1838: James MacCullagh (physics)
1839: James Apjohn (physics); George Petrie (history)
1843: Robert Kane (chemistry)
1848: Samuel Haughton (mathematics); Sir William Rowan Hamilton (mathematics); Edward Hincks (orientalist); John O'Donovan (history)
1851: John Hewitt Jellett (mathematics)
1858: Edward Joshua Cooper (astronomy); George Salmon (mathematics); Charles William Wall (literary criticism); William Reeves (history)
1862: Robert Mallet (seismology); Humphrey Lloyd (astronomy); John Thomas Gilbert (history); Whitley Stokes (linguistics)
1873: Sir William Wilde (polymath, father of Oscar Wilde) 
1878: George James Allman (natural history); Edward Dowden (literary criticism); Aquilla Smith (numismatics); John Casey (mathematics)
1879: Robert Stawell Ball (mathematics);  William Archer (natural history)
1881: Howard Grubb (astronomy)
1883: Edward Perceval Wright (editing Proceedings of RIA)
1884: John Birmingham (astronomy)
1885: John Christian Malet (mathematics)
Award suspended
1989: Frank Mitchell (natural history)
2001: Daniel Joseph Bradley (physics); Maurice Craig (architectural history); Sir Bernard Crossland (engineering); David Beers Quinn (history)
2005: Denis L. Weaire (physics)
2008: Seamus Heaney (poetry)
2011: John V McCanny (microelectronics)
2014: Patrick Honohan (economics)
2017: Dervilla M. X. Donnelly (chemistry)
2020: Nicholas Canny (history)

References

Royal Irish Academy
Academic awards
Irish awards